Sinomytilus is a genus of saltwater, brackish water and freshwater clams, marine bivalve molluscs in the subfamily Septiferinae of the family Mytilidae, the mussels.

Species
 Sinomytilus harmandi (Rochebrune, 1882)
 Sinomytilus morrisoni Brandt, 1974
 Sinomytilus swinhoei (H. Adams, 1870)

References

 Thiele, J. (1929-1935). Handbuch der systematischen Weichtierkunde. Jena, Gustav Fischer, 1154 pp. 

Mytilidae
Bivalve genera